Cong Xuedi (born May 13, 1963 in Shanghai) is a former Chinese basketball player. With a height of 166 cm, she served as point guard.

Cong enrolled in Shanghai Youth Team in 1981, and was admitted into Chinese national team in 1983. She competed at the 1984 Olympic Games and helped China win a bronze medal. She retired in 1989, but re-emerged in 1990 due to floundering performance of national team. She competed at 1992 Olympic Games in Barcelona and won a silver medal.

After retirement once again, Cong became the head coach of Shanghai Women's Basketball Team in 1995. From 2003, she has served as a coach in national second team.

References
 

1963 births
Living people
Chinese women's basketball players
Basketball players from Shanghai
Basketball players at the 1984 Summer Olympics
Basketball players at the 1988 Summer Olympics
Basketball players at the 1992 Summer Olympics
Medalists at the 1992 Summer Olympics
Medalists at the 1984 Summer Olympics
Olympic bronze medalists for China
Olympic silver medalists for China
Olympic medalists in basketball
Olympic basketball players of China
Basketball players at the 1986 Asian Games
Asian Games medalists in basketball
Point guards
Asian Games gold medalists for China
Medalists at the 1986 Asian Games
Chinese women's basketball coaches
20th-century Chinese women